Sumbek is a town and Village Development Committee  in Ilam District in the Province No. 1 of eastern Nepal. At the time of the 1991 Nepal census it had a population of 2,228 persons living in 388 individual households.

References

sumbek mein nyaure urf niraula budha vi rehata hai

External links
UN map of the municipalities of Ilam District

Populated places in Ilam District